Veterans Park may refer to:

 Veterans Park (Mount Vernon, Illinois), a former sports facility in Mount Vernon, Illinois 
 Veterans Park (Holyoke, Massachusetts), a city park in Holyoke, Massachusetts
 Veterans Park (Charlotte, North Carolina), a city park Charlotte, North Carolina
 Veterans Park Amphitheater, an amphitheater in Albany, Georgia.

See also 
 Veterans Memorial Park (disambiguation)